Elisha Benjamin Andrews (January 10, 1844 – October 30, 1917) was an American economist, soldier, and educator.

Early life

Andrews was born in Hinsdale, New Hampshire.

Career 
He served in Connecticut regiments during the Civil War as a private and later promoted through ranks to 2nd lieutenant.  He was wounded on August 24, 1865, at Petersburg.

Graduating from Brown University in 1870 and from the Newton Theological Institution in 1874, he preached for one year and then was president of Denison University from 1875 to 1879.  He was professor of homiletics at Newton Theological Institution from 1879 to 1882; professor of history and political economy at Brown University from 1882 to 1888; professor of political economy and finance at Cornell University from 1888 to 1889; and he served as the president of Brown University from 1889 until 1898.  He resigned as president of Brown in 1897 because of criticism by trustees of his advocacy of free silver but at that time withdrew his resignation.

On February 1, 1890, he became a charter member and the organizing president of the Rhode Island Society of the Sons of the American Revolution (RISSAR).  He was succeeded in that office later that year by John Nicholas Brown I.  Ironically, although both Andrews and Brown were active in organizing the RISSAR, neither formally applied for membership in the organization.

In 1892, he was an American commissioner to the Brussels monetary conference and was a strong supporter of international bimetallism.  He was also elected a member of the American Antiquarian Society in 1892.

He was the superintendent of schools for Chicago from 1898 to 1900, and then became chancellor of the University of Nebraska in 1900.  He retired from academic life as chancellor emeritus of the University of Nebraska on January 1, 1909.  He became a member of the corporation of Brown University in 1900 and was made president of the American Association of State Colleges and Universities in 1904.

Andrews died at his home in Interlachen, Florida in 1917.

Publisher
Andrews published many college textbooks on history and economics, including:  
 An Honest Dollar (1889; third edition, 1894)
 Wealth and Moral Law (1894)
 History of the United States (two volumes, 1894)
 History of the United States (six volumes, 1903–12)
 The History of the Last Quarter Century in the United States, 1870-95 (1896; revised under the title The United States in Our Own Time, 1903)

References

 
 American National Biography, vol. 1, pp. 494–496.

External links
 History of the United States, Volume I
 History of the United States, Volume 3
 
 

1844 births
1917 deaths
19th-century Christian clergy
Cornell University faculty
American Christian clergy
American educational theorists
American economics writers
American male non-fiction writers
Economists from New Hampshire
19th-century American historians
Brown University alumni
Brown University faculty
Presidents of Denison University
People of Connecticut in the American Civil War
Presidents of Brown University
University of Nebraska–Lincoln faculty
19th-century American male writers
People from Hinsdale, New Hampshire
People from Interlachen, Florida
Members of the American Antiquarian Society
Chancellors of the University of Nebraska-Lincoln
Economists from Florida
19th-century American economists
20th-century American economists
Union Army officers
Superintendents of Chicago Public Schools
19th-century American clergy
Historians from Illinois
Historians from Florida
Military personnel from Illinois